Al Hubbard is the name of:

Al Hubbard (baseball) (1860–1930), American baseball player
Al Hubbard (LSD pioneer) (1901–1982), American proponent for LSD during the 1950s
Al Hubbard (comics) (1915–1984), American illustrator who helped create several Disney Duck family characters
Al Hubbard (activist) (born 1936), African-American veteran of Air Force service and anti-war activist

See also
Allan Hubbard (disambiguation)
Alfred Hubbard (disambiguation)